Gheorghe Berdar (born 26 March 1961) is a Romanian biathlete. He competed in the 10 km sprint event at the 1984 Winter Olympics.

References

External links
 

1961 births
Living people
Romanian male biathletes
Olympic biathletes of Romania
Biathletes at the 1984 Winter Olympics
People from Botoșani County